"Like a Pimp" is a song by David Banner, released in 2003 from Mississippi: The Album. The song features fellow rapper Lil Flip and its accompanying music video was directed by Bernard Gourley. A portion of the song's chorus ("Girls get down on the floor") is interpolated from the  UGK song "Take It Off" from their 2001 album Dirty Money as well as The Showboy's "Drag Rap (Triggerman)". It is recognized as one of Banner's signature songs along with "Play" and "Get Like Me". A remix of the song featuring Busta Rhymes and Twista appears on Banner's follow-up album MTA2: Baptized in Dirty Water.

Charts
The song reached No. 48 on the Billboard Hot 100, No. 15 on the R&B/Hip-Hop Songs chart, and No. 10 on the Rap Songs chart.

Weekly charts

Year-end charts

References

Songs about procurers
Songs about prostitutes
2003 singles
David Banner songs
Lil' Flip songs
Song articles with missing songwriters
2003 songs
Songs written by David Banner
Songs written by Barry White
Songs written by Lil' Flip
Universal Records singles
SRC Records singles